Deportivo San Pedro is a Guatemalan Football Club based in San Pedro Sacatepequez, San Marcos Department.

They play their home games in the Estadio Municipal San Pedro Sacatepequez.

It was founded in 1992 is better known as the roosters that has won 3 titles throughout its history won a first division title in 2008 he won the University of San Carlos later in 2015 and descended to second division and won one of his two second division titles against the sports Reu 4-2 at the San Miguel Petapa Stadium, then achieved the ascent at the pensive stadium against Siquinala where he won 1-0 on June 12, 2016 and by bad administration the sports San Pedro descended again to the second division and that same year he achieved another division league title against the sportsman Quiché 1-0 at the mario camposeco stadium on December 10, 2017, in 2018 he achieved the first division ascent earning the ascent at the mario camposeco stadium On June 10, 2018 against Panajachel 5-1, the sportsman San Pedro achieved second place in the Guatemalan Cup tournament in 2019 against the Coban sportsman losing the first leg 1-2 and the second leg 2-0.

The sportsman San Pedro has a great hobby that has never abandoned him

Current squad

List of coaches

  Douglas Zamora (2017)
  Adrián Barrios (2018)
  Roberto Gamarra (2019)
  Francisco Melgar (2020)

References

Football clubs in Guatemala
Association football clubs established in 1992
1992 establishments in Guatemala